Voldemar-Viktor Rieberg (before 1935 Riiberg; 12 May 1886 – 21 September 1952 Baden-Baden, Germany) was an Estonian military personnel (Major-General).

In 1911 he graduated from Tbilisi Military School. He participated on Estonian War of Independence. During the war he was the commander of Engineering Battalion. 1924-1939 he was on different posts at Engineering Military Unit.

Awards:
 1939: Order of the Cross of the Eagle, II class.

References

1886 births
1952 deaths
Estonian military personnel
Estonian emigrants to Germany